Chandrakant Mandhare ((13 August 1913 – 17 February 2001) was a well-known Marathi Film actor and an artist. He played different roles in Marathi films and devoted his life to art. He was a master in paintings and powder shading.

He was the elder brother of Suryakant Mandhare.

Films as actor 
 Maanache Paan (1949)
 Chhatrapati Shivaji (1952)
 Punvechi Raat (1955)
 Sangte Aika (1959)
Navrang (1959)
 Padada (1963)
 Swayamwar Zale Seeteche (1964)
 Bai Mee Bholi (1967)
 Patleen
 Ek Mati Anek Nati (1968)
 Mukkam Post Dhebewadi (1969)
 Aai Ude Ga Ambabai (1973)
Ashta Vinayak (1979)
 Soon Mazi Laxmi (1981)
 Bangarwadi (1995)..Karbhari
 Satichi Punyai

References

External links
  Chandrakant Mandare is no more, rrtd.nic.in website (Government of India) citing Deccan Herald, 27 March 2001
 http://www.screenindia.com/20010323/recover.htm

Indian male painters
Male actors in Marathi cinema
1913 births
2001 deaths
People from Kolhapur
20th-century Indian painters
20th-century Indian male actors
Painters from Maharashtra
20th-century Indian male artists